Diocese of Waterford and Lismore may refer to:

The former Church of Ireland Diocese of Waterford and Lismore
The Roman Catholic Diocese of Waterford and Lismore

See also
Bishop of Waterford and Lismore